The Personal Ordinariate of Our Lady of the Southern Cross is a personal ordinariate of the Latin Church of the Catholic Church primarily within the territory of the Australian Catholic Bishops' Conference for groups of Anglicans who desire full communion with the Catholic Church in Australia and Asia. Personal ordinariates, like military ordinariates and dioceses, are immediately subject to the Holy See in Rome. The motto of the ordinariate is Mea Gloria Fides (My Faith is my Glory). The current ordinary is Carl Reid, who succeeded the first ordinary, Harry Entwistle, in 2019.

Structure
A personal ordinariate established under the apostolic constitution Anglicanorum coetibus is canonically equivalent to a diocese. The faithful of the ordinariate are led by an ordinary. The ordinary may be either a bishop, if celibate, or priest, if married.

The ordinary of a personal ordinariate is the equivalent to a diocesan bishop, and thus wears the same ecclesiastical attire and uses the same pontifical insignia (mitre, crosier, pectoral cross, and episcopal ring) as a diocesan bishop, even if not a bishop.

History
In the first decade of the 21st century, a number of bishops from the Church of England and the Traditional Anglican Communion (TAC), a global "continuing Anglican" body, independently approached the Vatican seeking some manner of corporate reunion that would preserve their autonomy and their ecclesial structure within the Catholic Church. Pope Benedict XVI promulgated an apostolic constitution, Anglicanorum coetibus, permitting erection of personal ordinariates equivalent to dioceses, on 4 November 2009. The Vatican subsequently erected three ordinariates:  the Personal Ordinariate of Our Lady of Walsingham in the territory of the episcopal conference of England and Wales on 15 January 2011, the Personal Ordinariate of the Chair of Saint Peter in the territory of the United States Conference of Catholic Bishops (USCCB) on 1 January 2012 and the Personal Ordinariate of Our Lady of the Southern Cross in the territory of Australian Conference of Catholic Bishops on 15 June 2012.

The decree erecting the Personal Ordinariate of the Southern Cross designated the Church of Saints Ninian and Chad in Perth as the principal church of the ordinariate, which fulfills the same role as the cathedral church of a diocese. This church building previously housed a congregation of the Anglican Catholic Church in Australia (ACCA), the Australian province of the Traditional Anglican Communion (TAC). Pope Benedict XVI concurrently appointed Harry Entwistle, a former bishop of the ACCA who received ordination as a presbyter of the Catholic Church on the same day, as the first ordinary. , the ordinariate has 18 congregations throughout Australia and Japan.

The ordinariate announced that the Church of Torres Strait, previously a separate ecclesiastical province of the TAC, was coming into the ordinariate substantially intact and was going to form a territorial deanery in that region. However, the Church of Torres Strait later decided not to join the ordinariate. In spite of this, a parish on Dauan Island in the Torres Strait chose to enter the ordinariate anyway and a former priest of the Church of Torres Strait was ordained as a transitional deacon in June 2018 by James Foley of Cairns.

On 26 March 2019, Pope Francis accepted the resignation of the first ordinary, Harry Entwistle, after he reached retirement, and appointed as ordinary Carl Reid, until then the dean of the Deanery of St John the Baptist (Canada) of the Personal Ordinariate of the Chair of St Peter. Reid was installed on 27 August 2019.

Communities
Since its inception, the ordinariate has grown to include 15 Australian congregations in Queensland, Victoria, Western Australia, South Australia and New South Wales.

Outside Australia
The ordinariate has also begun to form in Japan, where it has presently two congregations. In February 2015, a congregation of the Traditional Anglican Church of Japan was received as the Ordinariate Community of St Augustine of Canterbury in Tokyo, the first ordinariate community in Asia. In June 2016, another priest was ordained for the Ordinariate Community of St Laurence of Canterbury in Hiroshima.

The ordinariate is also present in Guam with one parish.

Liturgical calendar

See also

Anglican Communion
Anglican realignment
Anglican–Roman Catholic dialogue
Anglo-Catholicism
List of Anglican bishops who converted to Roman Catholicism

References

External links
 
 Ordinariate Japan (in Japanese)

2012 establishments in Australia
Catholic Church in Asia
Catholic Church in Australia
Catholic Church in Japan
Our Lady of the Southern Cross
Pope Benedict XVI
Christian organizations established in 2012
Roman Catholic dioceses in Australia
Roman Catholic dioceses in Japan
Roman Catholic dioceses and prelatures established in the 21st century